The 1895 Colgate football team represented Colgate University in the 1895 college football season. The team captain for the 1895 season was L. Jay Caldwell.

Schedule

References

Colgate
Colgate Raiders football seasons
Colgate football